Mr. Men is a British series of children's books written and illustrated by English author Roger Hargreaves which began publication in August 1971. From 1981, an accompanying series of Little Miss books by the same author (but with female characters) was published. A similar series of animal characters known as Timbuctoo started in 1978. After Hargreaves's death in 1988, his son Adam Hargreaves began writing and illustrating new Mr. Men and Little Miss stories.

Each book in the original Mr. Men and Little Miss series introduced a different title character and his/her single dominant personality trait to convey a simple moral lesson. The Mr. Men and Little Miss characters frequently reappeared in other characters' books. As of 2021, a total of 92 Mr. Men and Little Miss characters had been featured in the series. The books' simple stories, with brightly coloured, boldly drawn illustrations, have sold over 100 million copies worldwide across 28 countries.

History

Roger Hargreaves 
The first six Mr. Men books were published in the United Kingdom on 10 August 1971. Mr. Tickle was the first Mr. Men character created by Hargreaves, inspired by his son Adam, who had asked him what a tickle looked like. Hargreaves responded with a round, orange figure with long, bendy arms. The account of the first book's creation is currently being disputed. According to John Malam, who wrote Roger Hargreaves' entry in the Oxford Dictionary of National Biography, the inspiration for his initial creations came while doodling at work. Malam told Amelia Tait of the New Statesman in 2021 of the anecdote about his son's query: "It became too good to dispute and no doubt helped in the early marketing campaigns." Also, Adam's question was one of his most impossible questions as said in the documentary 50 Years of Mr. Men.

Over the course of the 1970s, Roger Hargreaves produced 38 more Mr. Men in addition to Mr. Tickle, as well as producing a number of other Mr. Men books. In the 1980s, Roger Hargreaves began the Little Miss series with 'Little Miss Bossy', and he produced 21 characters and books. As well as this, two special Mr. Men stories were created in 1985 ('Mr. Nobody' and 'Mr. Christmas'). Both of these books have been re-released in later years. Roger Hargreaves died in 1988, and his son Adam took over the franchise.

Adam Hargreaves 
After his father's death, Adam Hargreaves took over the Mr. Men. He now draws the characters and writes new stories for them, such as Mr. Cool, Mr. Rude, Mr. Good, Little Miss Scary, Little Miss Bad, Little Miss Whoops, Little Miss Princess, Little Miss Hug, Mr. Adventure, Mr. Marvelous, Little Miss Fabulous, Little Miss Sparkle, Little Miss Inventor, Mr. Calm, and Little Miss Brave.

A competition was held in the British Sunday Times newspaper for children to submit their own Mr. Men character for inclusion in a limited edition celebrating the 30th anniversary of the series. Mr. Cheeky was selected as the winning entry, submitted by then-eight-year-old Gemma Almond. Her creation led to a book featuring her character being published; it was sold only in W H Smith branches, with a portion of the proceeds going to a charity, supporting children with leukemia.

In 2003, Adam created three new Mr. Men characters and three new Little Miss characters. He also created 'Little Miss Christmas' to accompany 'Mr. Christmas' after this book was rereleased with new illustrations.

In April 2004, Hargreaves' widow Christine sold the rights to the Mr. Men and Little Miss characters to UK entertainment group Chorion for £28 million. They called their company THOIP. In 2006, to celebrate 35 years of Mr. Men and 25 years of Little Miss, Mr. Birthday and Little Miss Birthday were published. In October 2006, Adam Hargreaves created the first Little Miss character based on the real person Stella McCartney, who he named Little Miss Stella. This was published as a limited edition of 1,000 copies for use as fashion show invitations.

In February 2011, 20th Century Fox and 21 Laps Entertainment announced plans for an animated film.

In 2011, Sanrio, the Japanese design company best known as the creators of Hello Kitty, announced that they had reached an agreement to acquire the rights to the Mr. Men and Little Miss characters from Chorion after the company was forced into administration, so they used the THOIP company to take over. This marked the first time that Sanrio had licensed a third-party character since owning the rights to Osamu Tezuka's Unico character in the late 1970s and early 1980s, which was returned to Tezuka Productions after Tezuka's death in 1989. Sanrio had also acquired the license to produce Peanuts merchandise for the Japanese market. In 2016, four new characters were launched to celebrate the series' 45th anniversary: Mr. Marvelous, Mr. Adventure, Little Miss Fabulous, and Little Miss Sparkle. Little Miss Explorer, a special book for Heathrow was also launched. Little Miss Valentine was introduced to the US market in 2019 with Little Miss Inventor being the latest mainline character to receive a book. Adam Hargreaves has also created several commercial characters, such as Mr. Glug for Evian water, Little Miss Miracle beauty cream, Mr. and Little Miss Gap, and Mr. First for money transfer company World First. In 2017, Adam Hargreaves launched a new series of books featuring characters from the BBC science-fiction series Doctor Who, with each book focusing on a different incarnation of the show's titular character. These were followed by editions based on the Spice Girls in 2019.

On 10 August 2021 (the 50th anniversary of the first book), special editions were published and new characters were introduced as part of a public vote to select two who will join the main characters, Mr. Brilliant, Little Miss Kind, Little Miss Brave, Mr. Calm, and Little Miss Energy. The chosen Mr. Men for the competition were Mr. Calm and Little Miss Brave.

On 6 October 2021, it was announced that a brand new Mr. Men Little Miss series would be created by Endeavor Content

Format 
Each book contains a title page, 16 to 18 text pages, and 15 to 17 colour illustrations drawn with a Magic Marker. Instead of being in a reduced font size, it curves down at the end where the name of the titular Mr. Men character is too long to fit on the cover horizontally. The typeface for the original Little Miss books from Little Miss Bossy to Little Miss Star is Univers, with the books from Little Miss Busy to Little Miss Somersault using Helvetica. In the Mr. Men series, Mr. Brave to Mr. Cheerful use Helvetica. All the other books in the Mr. Men and Little Miss series use Optima. All of the Little Miss books also sometimes use Optima. The books are paperback with dimensions of 14 cm x 12.6 cm. If all the books of each series are put together in order, the words 'My Mr. Men library' or 'My Little Miss library' can be read across the spines and an illustration of Walter the Worm (Mr. Men) or a flower (Little Miss) can be seen.

Setting 
The stories are set in a fictional universe called "Misterland", which is inhabited by the Mr. Men and Little Misses themselves, as well as some ordinary human characters such as shopkeepers, doctors and postmen. There are also various animals; Walter the Worm is the main animal who appears frequently. The characters are human in their behaviours and attributes.

Product range 

There are 80 licensees selling Mr. Men and Little Miss products, including:

List of books 

The following is a list of the book titles with year of first publication and associated ISBNs given in parenthesis. There are many more titles published as translations including publications in French, Spanish, German, Portuguese, Dutch, Greek, Icelandic, Hebrew, Chinese, Korean, Irish, and others.

"Mr. Men" series

"Little Miss" series

Special editions

Mr. Men & Little Miss (Celebrations)

"Mr. Men" New Library

"Little Miss" New Library

Egmont published 2014 (based on 1995 TV series episodes)

Mr. Men & Little Miss (Adventures)

Mr. Men & Little Miss (Everyday)

Mr. Men & Little Miss (Magic)

Mr. Men & Little Miss (At Work)

Mr. Men & Little Miss (Discover You)

Promotional editions (free with L'Oreal Kids shampoo)

"Be My" series

Little Owl 
These stories were published as Little Owl Storytime – The Children's Choice.

Word Books

String Books

Guides

Chunkies

"Start to" series

Board books

Miscellaneous

Mr. Men for Grown-Ups

TV series

Original TV series (1974–1978) 

The Mr. Men characters were adapted into two animated television series, with the first beginning on 31 December 1974, consisting of 28 episodes in total. They were produced by Terry Ward's company Flicks Films (formerly known as 101 Film Productions) in partnership with Trevor Bond, and it was broadcast on BBC 1. Actor Arthur Lowe provided the narration and voices and used regional accents for some of the characters. The musical theme was composed by Tony Hymas.

The 28 episodes were:

Series 1 (1974-76)

Series 2 (1976-78)

Little Miss TV series (1983) 
Beginning in the middle of February 1983, a further series featuring the Little Miss characters was also produced by Flicks Films and aired on BBC 1. This was narrated by husband and wife John Alderton and Pauline Collins. The theme song and credits were composed by Dave Cooke and Richard Everett. The 13 Little Miss episodes were:

When the episodes were first broadcast on BBC 1 beginning on 14 February 1983, they were paired with reruns of the 1974 Mr. Men series, as the theme music and background music of said reruns were changed and rewritten to match the style of the Little Miss theme music. Both Little Miss and reruns of Mr. Men aired on BBC 1 from its debut until its last BBC 1 airing on 15 June 1987. Less than a year later, reruns on both Little Miss and Mr. Men were moved to BBC2 beginning on 27 January 1988 until its last airing on 22 December 1988. This was the first Mr. Men based series to air in the United States, getting 2 VHS releases from Warner Home Video with an American redub in 1986. The entire series was released to VHS in October 2003 in the UK.

Mr. Men and Little Miss (1995–1997) 

Another series, Mr. Men and Little Miss, was produced by Marina Productions in 1995 and originally aired on British and Irish television from 1995 to 1997; these stories had in it Geoffrey Palmer, Gordon Peters as the narrator, and Jill Shilling and were aired on Nick Jr. and Channel 5's Milkshake! in the late 1990s and early 2000s. The show first aired on CITV.

In 2014, 50 of the stories from this series were released as books.

In 1996, the series was localised in the United States and Canada as The Mr. Men Show; this series incorporated live-action segments as well as three episodes from the original series redubbed with Canadian voice actors. This version lasted for only one season.

The series was a co-production between Marina Productions in France and Flicks Films in the UK. Terry Ward was the co-producer and director in London.

The Mr. Men Show (2008-2009) 

By the beginning of 2007, Chorion had its series of books licensed to Renegade Animation to produce The Mr. Men Show which debuted on the Cartoon Network in North America and on Channel 5's Milkshake! in the United Kingdom in February 2008. There were only 25 characters featured in the first season, although most had their names or appearances altered. The Mr. Men Show was written and produced by Eryk Casemiro and Kate Boutilier and directed by Mark Risley. The creative team was a combined effort of personnel from Nickelodeon's Rugrats, The Wild Thornberrys, and As Told by Ginger. All of the opening and closing parts are narrated by Joey D'Auria (credited as  Joseph J. Terry) in the US and Simon Callow in the UK.

Untitled Mr. Men series (2023) 
On 6 October 2021, Endeavor Content announced a new Mr. Men and Little Miss series. It will be likely to premiere in 2023.

UK video and DVD releases 
 Warner Home Video (1981)
 20th Century Fox Home Entertainment (1988, 1995–1997)
 Abbey Home Media (1991–1994, 1998–2001, 2006, 2016–2020)
 Delta Music (2002–2015)
 Sony Pictures Home Entertainment (2008–2009)

Film 
In February 2011, it was reported that 20th Century Fox Animation was developing an animated feature film based on the Mr. Men book series, with Shawn Levy producing the film through his company 21 Laps Entertainment. On 27 January 2015, Fox Animation confirmed that it had acquired the film rights to the Mr. Men Little Miss characters. No updates on the film have been made as of 2022, however.

See also
The Mr. Men Show
List of Mr. Men
Mr. Men and Little Miss
List of Little Miss characters
The Mr. Men Show (1997 TV series)
Timbuctoo
Roger Hargreaves
Adam Hargreaves

References

Further reading 

 Sheridan, Simon: The A to Z of Classic Children's Television, Reynolds & Hearn books, 2004, reprinted 2007.

External links 
 Mr. Men official site

1970s British animated television series
1970s British children's television series
1974 British television series debuts
1980s British animated television series
1980s British children's television series
1983 British television series endings
BBC children's television shows
Book series introduced in 1971
British children's animated comedy television series
British picture books
British television shows based on children's books
English-language television shows
Sanrio characters
1971 children's books